Lake Sarah is a lake in Hennepin County, in the U.S. state of Minnesota.

Lake Sarah was named for the love interest of a pioneer settler.

See also
List of lakes in Minnesota

References

Lakes of Minnesota
Lakes of Hennepin County, Minnesota